The fundamental plane in a spherical coordinate system is a plane of reference that divides the sphere into two hemispheres. The geocentric latitude of a point is then the angle between the fundamental plane and the line joining the point to the centre of the sphere.

For a geographic coordinate system of the Earth, the fundamental plane is the Equator. 

Astronomical coordinate systems have varying fundamental planes:
 The horizontal coordinate system uses the observer's horizon.
 The Besselian coordinate system uses Earth's terminator (day/night boundary). This is a Cartesian coordinate system (x, y, z).
 The equatorial coordinate system uses the celestial equator.
 The ecliptic coordinate system uses the ecliptic.
 The galactic coordinate system uses the Milky Way's galactic equator.

See also
Plane of reference

References

Geography
Spherical geometry
Cartography
Planes (geometry)